The Little Ballerina is a 1947 British drama film directed by Lewis Gilbert.

Cast
 Yvonne Marsh as Joan  
 Marian Chapman as Sally  
 Kay Henderson as Pamela  
 Doreen Richards as Lydia  
 Anita Holland as Carol  
 Beatrice Varley as Mrs. Field  
 Herbert C. Walton as Grandpa  
 George Carney as Bill  
 Anthony Newley as Johnny  
 Martita Hunt as Miss Crichton  
 Leslie Dwyer as Barney  
 Eliot Makeham as Mr. Maggs  
 Margot Fonteyn as herself

External links

 

1947 films
1947 drama films
British drama films
Films directed by Lewis Gilbert
British black-and-white films
1947 directorial debut films
1940s British films